Mario Ardizzon (2 January 1938 – 30 November 2012) was an Italian footballer.

Ardizzon was born in Chioggia, and played 10 seasons (253 games, 3 goals) in the Serie A for S.S.C. Venezia, A.S. Roma and Bologna F.C. 1909.  He died, aged 74, in Venice.

References

External links

1938 births
2012 deaths
Italian footballers
Serie A players
Venezia F.C. players
A.S. Roma players
Bologna F.C. 1909 players
Association football defenders